A kachina (also katchina, katcina, or katsina; Hopi:  katsina , plural katsinim ) is a spirit being in the religious beliefs of the Pueblo peoples, Native American cultures located in the south-western part of the United States. In the Pueblo cultures, kachina rites are practiced by the Hopi, Zuni, Hopi-Tewa, and certain Keresan tribes, as well as in most Pueblo tribes in New Mexico.

The kachina concept has three different aspects: the supernatural being, the kachina dancers, and kachina dolls (small dolls carved in the likeness of the kachina, that are given only to those who are, or will be responsible for the respectful care and well-being of the doll, such as a mother, wife, or sister).

Overview 
Kachinas are spirits or personifications of things in the real world. These spirits are believed to visit the Hopi villages during the first half of the year. The local pantheon of kachinas varies from pueblo community to community. A kachina can represent anything in the natural world or cosmos, from a revered ancestor to an element, a location, a quality, a natural phenomenon, or a concept; there may be kachinas for the sun, stars, thunderstorms, wind, corn, insects, as well as many other concepts.

Kachinas are understood as having human-like relationships: families such as parents and siblings, as well as marrying and having children. Although not worshipped, each is viewed as a powerful being who, if given veneration and respect, can use his particular power for human good, bringing rainfall, healing, fertility, or protection, for example. Everything has an essence or a life force, and humans must interact with these or fail to survive."

Commercialization 
Beginning around 1900, there was a great deal of interest in the Kachina figurines, especially among tourists, and the dolls became sought-after collectibles. For this reason, many Hopi began making the figurines commercially to make a living.

Hopi kachinas
In many ways the Kachina rites are the most important ceremonial observances in the Hopi religious calendar. Within Hopi religion, the kachinas are said to live on the San Francisco Peaks near Flagstaff, Arizona. To the Hopis, kachinas are supernatural beings who visit the villages to help the Hopis with everyday activities and act as a link between gods and mortals.

According to Susanne and Jake Page, the katsinam are "the spirits of all things in the universe, of rocks, stars, animals, plants, and ancestors who have lived good lives."  These spirits are then impersonated by male dancers wearing costumes and masks for ceremonies during the first half of the year.

The first ceremony of the year, the Powamu, occurs in February and is associated with the bean planting, the growing season, and coming of age. The last katsina ceremony, Niman, occurs in July and is associated with the harvest, after which the katsinam return to their home in the San Francisco Peaks.

Hopi kachina dolls, tihü, are ceremonial objects with religious meaning. Hopi carvers alter these, removing their religious meaning, to meet the demand for decorative commercial objects sought by non-Hopi.

Wuya
The most important Hopi kachinas are known as wuya. In Hopi, the term wuya often refers to the spiritual beings themselves (said to be connected with the Fifth World, Taalawsohu), the dolls, or the people who dress as kachinas for ceremonial dances. These are all understood to embody all aspects of the same belief system. Some of the wuyas include:

 Ahöla
 Ahöl Maana
 Aholi
 Ahul
 Ahulani
 Akush
 Alosaka
 Angak
 Angwushahai-i
 Angwusnasomtaka
 Eototo
 Hahay-i Wuhti
 He-e-e
 Horo or Yohozro Wuhti
 Hu
 Huruing Wuhti
 Kalavi
 Kaletaka
 Ketowa Visena
 Kötsav
 Kököle
 Kokopelli
 Kokosori
 Kokyang Wuhti
 Koshari or Koyaala
 Kwasai Taka
 Lemowa
 Masau'u
 Mastop
 Maswik
 Mong
 Muyingwa
 Nakiatsop
 Nataska
 Ongtsomo
 Pahlikmana or Polik-mana
 Patsava Hú
 Patung
 Pöqangwhoya
 Pohaha or Pahana
 Saviki
 Shalako Taka
 Shalako Mana
 Söhönasomtaka
 Soyal
 Tanik'tsina
 Tawa
 Tiwenu
 Toho
 Tokoch
 Tsaveyo
 Tsa'kwayna
 Tsimon Maana
 Tsitot
 Tsiwap
 Tsowilawu
 Tukwinong
 Tukwinong Mana
 Tumas
 Tumuala
 Tungwup
 Ursisimu
 We-u-u
 Wiharu
 Wukoqala
 Wupa-ala
 Wupamo
 Wuyak-kuyta

Zuni kachinas
Religious ceremonies are central to the Zuni agrarian society.  They revolve around the winter and summer solstices, incorporate the importance of weather, especially rain, and ensure successful crops.  According to Tanner, "Father Sky and Mother Earth are venerated, as are the welcome kachinas who bring many blessings."

The Zuni believe that the kachinas live in the Lake of the Dead, a mythical lake which is reached through Listening Spring Lake.  This is located at the junction of the Zuni River and the Little Colorado River. Although some archaeological investigations have taken place, they have not been able to clarify which tribe, Zuni or Hopi, developed the Kachina Cult first. Both Zuni and Hopi kachinas are different from each other but have certain similarities and features. In addition, both Zuni and Hopi kachinas are highly featured and detailed, while the kachinas of the Rio Grande Pueblos look primitive in feature. The Hopis have built their cult into a more elaborate rite, and seem to have a greater sense of drama and artistry than the Zunis. On the other hand, the latter have developed a more sizable folklore concerning their kachinas.

According to Clara Lee Tanner, "...kachina involves three basic concepts: first, a supernatural being; second, the masked dancer (and the Zuni is a kachina when he wears the mask), and third the carved, painted, and dressed doll."  The list of Zuni kachinas includes:

A'Hute
Ainawua
Ainshekoko
Anahoho
A'thlanna
Atoshle Otshi
Awan Pekwin
Awan Pithlashiwanni
Awan Tatchu
Awek Suwa Hanona
Bitsitsi
Chakwaina
Chakwaina Okya
Chathlashi
Chilili
Eshotsi
Hainawi
Hehea
Hehe'a
Hemokatsiki
Hemushikiwe
Hetsululu
Hilili Kohana
Hututu
Ishan Atsan Atshi
Itetsona
Itsepasha
Kakali
Kalutsi
Kanatshu
Kanilona
Kiaklo
Kianakwe
Kianakwe Mosona
Kokokshi
Kokothlanna
Kokwele
Komokatsiki
Kothlamana
Koyemshi
Kwamumu
Kwamumu Okya
Kwelele
Lapilawe
Mahedinasha
Mitotasha
Mitsinapa
Mókwala
Mukikwe
Mukikw' Okya
Muluktaka
Muyapona
Nahalisho
Nahalish Awan Mosona
Nahalish Okya
Nalashi
Na'le
Na'le Okya
Na'le Otshi
Natashku
Natshimomo
Nawisho
Neneka
Nepaiyatemu
Ohapa
Oky'enawe (Girls)
Ololowishkia
Owiwi
Paiyatamu
Pakoko
Pakok'Okya
Pasikiapa
Pautiwa
Posuki
Potsikish
Saiyapa
Saiyatasha
Saiyathlia
Salimopia Itapanahnan'ona
Salimopia Kohan'ona
Salimopia Shelow'ona
Salimopia Shikan'ona
Salimopia Thlian'ona
Salimopia Thluptsin'ono
Sate'tshi E'lashokti
Shalako (6)
Shalako Anuthlona
Shi-tsukia
Shulawitsi
Shulawitsi An Tatchu
Shulawitsi Kohanna
Shumaikoli
Siwolo
Suyuki
Temtemshi
Thlelashoktipona
Thlewekwe
Thlewekwe Okya
Tomtsinapa
Tsathlashi
Upikaiapona
Upo'yona
Wahaha
Wakashi
Wamuwe
Wilatsukwe
Wilatsukw' Okya
Wo'latana
Yamuhakto
Yeibichai

Ceremonial dancers 
Many Pueblo Indians, particularly the Hopi and Zuni, have ceremonies in which masked men, called kachinas, play an important role. Masked members of the tribe dress up as kachinas for religious ceremonies that take place many times throughout the year. These ceremonies are social occasions for the village, where friends and relatives are able to come from neighboring towns to see the dance and partake in the feasts that are always prepared. When a Hopi man places a mask upon his head and wears the appropriate costume and body paint, his personal identity is lost and the spirit of the kachina he is supposed to represent takes its place. Besides the male kachinas are many female kachinas called kachin-manas, but women never take the part of male or female kachinas.

The most widely publicised of Hopi kachina rites is the "Snake Dance", an annual event during which the performers danced while handling live snakes.

Clowns 

Clown personages play dual roles. Their prominent role is to amuse the audience during the extended periods of the outdoor celebrations and Kachina Dances where they perform as jesters or circus clowns. Barry Pritzker stated, regarding the role of clowns in Hopi dances,

The clown's more subtle and sacred role is in the Hopis' ritual performances. The sacred functions of the clowns are relatively private, if not held secret by the Hopi, and as a result have received less public exposure.  When observing the preparations taking place in a Kiva of a number of Pai'yakyamu clowns getting ready for their ceremonial performance, Alexander Stephen was told, "We Koyala [Koshari] are the fathers of all Kachina."

The Hopi have four groups of clowns, some of which are sacred.  Adding to the difficulty in identifying and classifying these groups, there are a number of kachinas whose actions are identified as clown antics. Barton Wright's Clowns of the Hopi identifies, classifies, and illustrates the extensive array of clown personages.

Kachina dolls 

Kachina dolls are small brightly painted wooden "dolls" which are miniature representations of the masked impersonators. These figurines are given to children not as toys, but as objects to be treasured and studied so that the young Hopis may become familiar with the appearance of the kachinas as part of their religious training. During Kachina ceremonies, each child receives their own doll. The dolls are then taken home and hung up on the walls or from the rafters of the house, so that they can be constantly seen by the children. The purpose of this is to help the children learn to know what the different kachinas look like. It is said that the Hopi recognize over 200 kachinas and many more were invented in the last half of the nineteenth century. Among the Hopi, kachina dolls are traditionally carved by the maternal uncles and given to uninitiated girls at the Bean Dance (Spring Bean Planting Ceremony) and Home Dance Ceremony in the summer. These dolls are very difficult to classify not only because the Hopis have a vague idea about their appearance and function, but also because these ideas differ from mesa to mesa and pueblo to pueblo.

Origins 
There are two different accounts in Hopi beliefs for the origins of kachinas. According to one version, the kachinas were good-natured spirit-beings who came with the Hopis from the underworld. The kachinas wandered with the Hopis over the world until they arrived at Casa Grande, where both the Hopis and the kachinas settled. With their powerful ceremonies, the kachinas were of much help and comfort, for example bringing rain for the crops. However, all of the kachinas were killed when the Hopis were attacked and the kachinas' souls returned to the underworld. Since the sacred paraphernalia of the kachinas were left behind, the Hopis began impersonating the kachinas, wearing their masks and costumes, and imitating their ceremonies in order to bring rain, good crops, and life's happiness.

Another account says that the Hopis came to take the kachinas for granted, losing all respect and reverence for them, so the kachinas returned to the underworld. However, before they left, the kachinas taught some of their ceremonies to a few faithful young men and showed them how to make the masks and costumes. When the other Hopi realized their mistake, they remorsefully turned to the kachinas' human substitutes, and the ceremonies have continued since then.

See also 
 Awelo
 Heard Museum
 Hopi Kachina dolls

Notes

References

 Anderson, Frank G. (1955). The Pueblo Kachina Cult: A Historical Reconstruction. Southwestern Journal of Anthropology, 11, 404–419.
 Anderson, Frank G. (1956). Early documentary material on the Pueblo kachina cult. Anthropological Quarterly, 29, 31–44.
 Anderson, Frank G. (1960). Inter-tribal relations in the Pueblo kachina cult. In Fifth International Congress of Anthropological and Ethnological Sciences, selected papers (pp. 377–383).
 Dockstader, Frederick J. The Kachina & The White Man: A Study of The Influence of White Culture on The Hopi Kachina Cult, Bloomfield Hills, Michigan: Cranbook Institute of Science, 1954.
 Dozier, Edward P. (1970). The Pueblo Indians of North America. Holt, Rinehart, and Winston.
 Glenn, Edna "Kachinas," in Hopi Nation: Essays on Indigenous Art, Culture, History, and Law, 2008.
 Kennard, Edward A. & Edwin Earle. "Hopi Kachinas." New York: Museum of The American Indian, Hye Foundation, 1971.
 Schaafsma, Polly. (1972). Rock Art in New Mexico. Santa Fe: State Planning Office..
 Pecina, Ron and Pecina, Bob. Hopi Kachinas: History, Legends, and Art. Schiffer Publishing Ltd., 2013. ;  pp. 124–138
 Schaafsma, Polly (Ed.). (1994). Kachinas in the pueblo world. Albuquerque, NM: University of New Mexico Press.
 Schaafsma, Polly; & Schaafsma, Curtis F. (1974). Evidence for the origins of the Pueblo katchina cult as suggested by Southwestern rock art. American Antiquity, 39 (4), 535-545.
 Schlegel, Alice, "Hopi Social Structure as Related to Tihu Symbolism," in Hopi Nation: Essays on Indigenous Art, Culture, History, and Law, 2008.
 Sekaquaptewa, Helen. "Me & Mine: The Life Story of Helen Sekaquaptewa." Tucson, Arizona: University of Arizona Press, 1969.
 Stephen, Alexander M. "Hopi Journal." New York: Columbia University Press, 1936.
 Stephen, Alexander. Hopi Journal of Alexander  M. Stephen.  Edited by E. C. Parsons. Columbia University Contributions to Anthropology, 23, 2 volumes; 1936.
 Stewart, Tyrone. Dockstader, Frederick. Wright, Barton. "The Year of The Hopi: Paintings & Photographs by Joseph Mora, 1904-06." New York, Rizzoli International Publications, 1979.
 Talayesua, Don C. "Sun Chief: The Autobiography of a Hopi Indian." New Haven, Connecticut: Institute of Human Relations/Yale University Press, 1942.
 Titiev, Mischa. "Old Oraibi: A Study of The Hopi Indians of the Third Mesa." Cambridge, Massachusetts: Peabody Museum, 1944.
 Wright, Barton. Clowns of the Hopi. Northland Publishing; . 1994

 Wright, Barton. "Hopi Kachinas: The Complete Guide to Collecting Kachina Dolls." Flagstaff, Arizona: Northland Press, 1977.
 Wright, Barton, "Hopi Kachinas: A Life Force," in Hopi Nation: Essays on Indigenous Art, Culture, History, and Law, 2008.

External links

 Peabody Museum of Archaeology and Ethnology: Rainmakers From the Gods
 Native paths: American Indian art from the collection of Charles and Valerie Diker, an exhibition catalog from The Metropolitan Museum of Art (fully available online as PDF), which contains material on kachinas

Hopi culture
Pueblo culture
Native American religion
Indigenous woodcarving of the Americas
Arizona culture
New Mexico culture
Nature spirits
Tutelary deities